Superstars on the Superstation was a televised professional wrestling event, presented by Jim Crockett Promotions, filmed in advance at the Omni in Atlanta, Georgia, airing on TBS on February 7, 1986. The event drew 10,000 fans to the Omni, while the broadcast had a Nielsen ratings of 3.2. 

The event also featured several celebrities. Singer Willie Nelson, NASCAR legend Benny Parsons and Major League Baseball pitcher Gaylord Perry were all interviewed during the broadcast, with Nelson cutting a promo with Dusty Rhodes.

In August 2019 it was announced that Superstars on the Superstation would be uploaded to the WWE Network as a Hidden Gem.

Background
The premise behind the show was that fans could vote for four, "dream matches" of their choice. Three of the bouts were dark matches, but the final four matches were televised, three of which saw National Wrestling Alliance (NWA) titles defended.

Event
The first match of the broadcast saw the NWA World Tag Team Championship changed hands as Bobby Eaton of The Midnight Express pinned Ricky Morton of The Rock 'n' Roll Express to win the title. The ending to the match was controversial, however, as Eaton's partner, Dennis Condrey, hit Morton with a tennis racket to enable Eaton to score the pinfall.

The second match ended in a disqualification when Baron von Raschke and Krusher Khruschev interfered on behalf of Ivan Koloff and Nikita Koloff to attack The Road Warriors (Hawk and Animal).

Dusty Rhodes next successfully defended his NWA National Heavyweight Championship against Tully Blanchard when the match ended in a 20-minute time limit draw. After the match, Rhodes argued with Blanchard's manager, J. J. Dillon, which allowed Blanchard to attack Rhodes from behind. Despite not winning the title belt, Blanchard took it with him as he left the ring. 

Next, Jim Crockett, Jr. announced that the first Crockett Cup would take place later that year; this led to an interview with Bob Johnson, executive vice president of the Louisiana Superdome, where the tournament would be held.

In the final match, scheduled for television time remaining, saw Ric Flair defeat Ron Garvin to retain the NWA World Heavyweight Championship when the referee did not notice that Garvin's foot was on the bottom rope, which should have invalidated the pinfall.

Matches

References

1986 in professional wrestling
1980s American television specials
Jim Crockett Promotions shows
TBS (American TV channel) original programming
1986 television specials
Professional wrestling in Atlanta